Grace's High Falls is a seasonal waterfall in the US state of Alabama, in Little River Canyon National Preserve. The waterfall is Alabama's highest at 133 feet.

References

External links
"Graces High Falls Overlook", National Park Service

Waterfalls of Alabama